FastCat may refer to:

HSC FastCat Ryde
HSC FastCat Shanklin
Archipelago Philippine Ferries Corporation, a ferry company which operates as FastCat since 2013 after its catamaran fleet.
Fast Ferry Scandal, also known as the FastCat Fiasco, a political scandal involving the British Columbia provincial government and BC Ferries.